The 2017 German Open Grand Prix Gold was the fourth Grand Prix's badminton tournament of the 2017 BWF Grand Prix Gold and Grand Prix. The tournament was held at the Innogy Sporthalle in Mulheim an der Ruhr, Germany on 28 February–5 March 2017 and had a total purse of $120,000.

Men's singles

Seeds

 Jan Ø. Jørgensen (withdrew)
 Chen Long (semifinals)
 Lin Dan (third round)
 Tian Houwei (first round)
 Ng Ka Long (quarterfinals)
 Chou Tien-chen (champion)
 Marc Zwiebler (second round)
 Hu Yun (third round)
 Hans-Kristian Vittinghus (quarterfinals)
 Rajiv Ouseph (second round)
 Wong Wing Ki (second round)
 Srikanth Kidambi (third round)
 Wei Nan (first round)
 Wang Tzu-wei (final)
 Hsu Jen-hao (first round)
 Anders Antonsen (third round)

Finals

Top half

Section 1

Section 2

Section 3

Section 4

Bottom half

Section 5

Section 6

Section 7

Section 8

Women's singles

Seeds

 Carolina Marín (final)
 Akane Yamaguchi (champion)
 Busanan Ongbamrungphan (second round)
 Zhang Beiwen (semifinals)
 Cheung Ngan Yi (quarterfinals)
 Nitchaon Jindapol (quarterfinals)
 Sayaka Sato (quarterfinals)
 Ayumi Mine (quarterfinals)

Finals

Top half

Section 1

Section 2

Bottom half

Section 3

Section 4

Men's doubles

Seeds

 Takeshi Kamura / Keigo Sonoda (first round)
 Mads Conrad-Petersen / Mads Pieler Kolding (final)
 Vladimir Ivanov / Ivan Sozonov (semifinals)
 Kim Astrup / Anders Skaarup Rasmussen (champion)
 Lee Jhe-huei / Lee Yang (second round)
 Marcus Ellis / Chris Langridge (first round)
 Chen Hung-ling / Wang Chi-lin (quarterfinals)
 Bodin Issara / Nipitphon Puangpuapech (quarterfinals)

Finals

Top half

Section 1

Section 2

Bottom half

Section 3

Section 4

Women's doubles

Seeds

 Naoko Fukuman / Kurumi Yonao (second round)
 Jongkolphan Kititharakul / Rawinda Prajongjai (quarterfinals)
 Gabriela Stoeva / Stefani Stoeva (quarterfinals)
 Della Destiara Haris / Rosyita Eka Putri Sari (quarterfinals)
 Huang Dongping / Li Yinhui (final)
 Eefje Muskens / Selena Piek (withdrew)
 Greysia Polii / Rizki Amelia Pradipta (second round)
 Shiho Tanaka / Koharu Yonemoto (semifinals)

Finals

Top half

Section 1

Section 2

Bottom half

Section 3

Section 4

Mixed doubles

Seeds

 Lu Kai / Huang Yaqiong (final)
 Chan Peng Soon / Goh Liu Ying (quarterfinals)
 Chris Adcock / Gabrielle Adcock (semifinals)
 Tan Kian Meng / Lai Pei Jing (semifinals)
 Bodin Isara / Savitree Amitrapai (second round)
 Kenta Kazuno / Ayane Kurihara (quarterfinals)
 Tang Chun Man / Tse Ying Suet (withdrew)
 Zhang Nan / Li Yinhui (champion)

Finals

Top half

Section 1

Section 2

Bottom half

Section 3

Section 4

External links 
 Tournament Link

German Open (badminton)
BWF Grand Prix Gold and Grand Prix
German Open
German Open
Sport in Mülheim